Laubenthal is a German surname that may refer to
 Horst Laubenthal (born 1937), German tenor and voice teacher
 Markus Laubenthal (born 1962), German general and Chief of Staff of U.S. Army Europe
 Paul Laubenthal, German aircraft designer
 Laubenthal Württemberg, a single seat glider 
 Sanders Anne Laubenthal (1943–2002), American poet, novelist, historian and textbook writer

German-language surnames